The 2013–14 Scottish Junior Cup was the 128th season of the Scottish Junior Cup, the national knockout tournament for member clubs of the Scottish Junior Football Association. The winner of this competition is eligible to enter the following season's Scottish Cup at the first round stage.

A total of 160 clubs entered, three fewer than the previous season. Dropping out were Bankfoot Athletic, Bishopmill United and Lossiemouth United, who were in abeyance, RAF Lossiemouth, who were playing in welfare football, and Spartans, who had transferred their Junior side to the East of Scotland League. New member Kennoway Star Hearts made their debut in the competition, while Dufftown returned to the tournament after a period of abeyance.

The four Junior clubs qualified for this season's Scottish Cup, were not included in the draw for the first round. These were the East Superleague champions Linlithgow Rose, North Superleague champions  Culter, West Super League champions and reigning Junior Cup holders Auchinleck Talbot and Girvan who qualify automatically as a full member of the Scottish Football Association.

Calendar
The scheduled dates for each round of the 2013–14 tournament are as follows:

Drawn matches are replayed the following weekend. Replays ending in a draw proceed direct to penalty shootout. Semi-finals are played home and away over two legs, subject to decision by the SJFA management committee.

First round
The first round draw took place at the Scottish Football Museum, Hampden Park, Glasgow on 3 September 2013.

1 Match played at Pinefield, Elgin.

Replays

Second round
The second round draw took place in the Auchinleck Talbot Social Club, Auchinleck on 9 October 2013. Girvan received a bye after Steelend Victoria went into abeyance prior to the draw.

2 Tie switched to Camelon after three postponements.

Replays

Third round
The third round draw took place at the offices of The Scottish Sun newspaper, Glasgow on 4 November 2013.

Replays

Fourth round
The fourth round draw took place at the offices of Evening Times newspaper, Glasgow on 12 December 2013.

3 Tie played at Largs Thistle F.C.

Replays

Fifth round
The fifth round draw took place in the Cumnock Juniors Social Club on 26 January 2014.

Replays

Quarter-final
The quarter final draw took place on the Central 103.1 FM Football Phone-In show on 26 February 2014.

Replay

Semi finals
The draw for the semi finals took place on the Central 103.1 FM Football Phone-In show on 27 March 2014.

First leg

Second leg

Final

References

4
Scottish Junior Cup seasons